Xenophilus is a genus of bacteria from the family Comamonadaceae.

References

Further reading 
 
 
 

Comamonadaceae
Bacteria genera